The inferior tympanic artery is a small branch of the ascending pharyngeal artery.

It is a small branch which passes through a minute foramen in the petrous portion of the temporal bone which is called tympanic canaliculus or inferior tympanic canaliculus, in company with the tympanic branch of the glossopharyngeal nerve, to supply the medial wall of the tympanic cavity and anastomose with the other tympanic arteries.

Clinical Significance 
In the case of a missing or underdeveloped cervical ICA, the Inferior tympanic artery can provide collateral ICA circulation by reversing flow of the caroticotympanic artery (embryologic hyoid artery).  This can result in pulsatile tinnitus.  The resulting Aberrant Carotid artery can mimic neoplasm on CT.

References

Arteries of the head and neck